Emma Rask (born 1 January 1996) is a Swedish former handballer for H 65 Höör and the Swedish national team. She announced she's taking a break from handball in 2022.

She represented Sweden at the 2020 European Women's Handball Championship.

Achievements 
Swedish League:
Winner: 2017
EHF Challenge Cup:
Finalist: 2017

References

External links

1996 births
Living people
People from Höör Municipality
Swedish female handball players
Handball players at the 2014 Summer Youth Olympics
Sportspeople from Skåne County
21st-century Swedish women